The Kinabalu giant earthworm, Pheretima darnleiensis, is a grey-blue coloured peregrine annelid. It is found widely in Southeast Asia, primarily in the Indo-Australasian Archipelago (e.g., Singapore, Sumatra, Java, Bali, Borneo, Sulawesi, the Philippines, some islands near New Guinea such as Darnley Island and Christmas Island), but also in Peninsular Malaysia. Records from the Caroline Islands and Fiji are believed to represent introductions This also applies to the eponymic Darnley Island record.

On Mount Kinabalu, Borneo, the animal grows to a length of approximately 70 cm and lives in burrows in the soft and thick soils around Paka Cave shelter, at an altitude of 3,000 m above sea level. The earthworm's segments are encircled by numerous setae and its skin has a greenish iridescent gloss. Amongst the Kinabalu earthworm's natural predators is another large annelid, the Kinabalu giant red leech. Both animals can only be seen during or after a heavy downpour.

References

External links
The giant leech and giant worm in Kinabalu Park, Borneo, Malaysia

Megascolecidae
Invertebrates of Borneo
Invertebrates of Malaysia
Fauna of Papua New Guinea
Fauna of the Philippines
Fauna of Singapore
Fauna of Bali
Fauna of Sulawesi
Fauna of Sumatra
Animals described in 1886
Taxa named by Joseph James Fletcher